Mueang Nakhon Si Thammarat is the capital district (amphoe mueang) of Nakhon Si Thammarat province in southern Thailand.

Geography
Neighboring districts are (from the southeast clockwise): Pak Phanang, Chaloem Phra Kiat, Phra Phrom, Lan Saka, Phrom Khiri and Tha Sala. To the east is the Gulf of Thailand.

Administration
The district is divided into 16 sub-districts (tambons), which are further subdivided into 114 villages (mubans).

The missing numbers 9-11 and 17 belong to communes which were split off in 1994 to form Phra Phrom District.

Nakhon Si Thammarat itself has city status (thesaban nakhon) and covers tambons Nai Mueang, Tha Wang, Khlang, and parts of Na Khian and Pho Sadet. There are a further three townships (thesaban tambons): Bang Chak covering parts of the same-named tambon, Tha Phae covering parts of tambon Pak Phun, and Pak Nakhon covering parts of tambons Tha Rai and Pak Nakhon. There are also 13 tambon administrative organizations (TAO).

References

External links
amphoe.com

Nakhon Si Thammarat
Districts of Nakhon Si Thammarat province